Anthony Benn  (7 October 1912 — 23 September 2008) was an English first-class cricketer and British Army officer.

Benn was born at Kensington in October 1912. He was educated at Harrow School, before going up to Christ Church, Oxford. While studying at Oxford, he played first-class cricket for Oxford University, making his debut against a combined Minor Counties cricket team at Oxford in 1934. The remainder of his nine first-class appearances for Oxford all followed in 1935. In his ten first-class matches for Oxford, Benn scored 378 runs at an average of 18.90, with a highest score of 90. With his right-arm medium pace bowling, he bowled a total of 34 wicketless overs, conceding 135 runs. 

After graduating from Oxford, he was commissioned as a second lieutenant in the  98th (Surrey and Sussex Yeomanry) in May 1936. With the Yeomanry forming a part of the Royal Artillery, Benn served in the Second World War, reaching the rank of temporary lieutenant colonel by the conclusion of the war. In December 1945, he was made an MBE. Benn died at Chichester in September 2008.

References

External links

1912 births
2008 deaths
Sportspeople from Kensington
People educated at Harrow School
Alumni of Christ Church, Oxford
English cricketers
Oxford University cricketers
Sussex Yeomanry officers
British Army personnel of World War II
Royal Artillery officers
Members of the Order of the British Empire